The 1993 European Judo Championships were the 4th edition of the European Judo Championships, and were held in Athens, Greece on 2 May 1993.

Medal overview

Men

Women

Medal table

Results overview

Men

60 kg

65 kg

71 kg

78 kg

86 kg

95 kg

+95 kg

Open class

Women

48 kg

52 kg

56 kg

61 kg

66 kg

72 kg

+72 kg

Open class

Notes

References 
 Results of the 1993 European Judo Championships (JudoInside.com)
 

E
European Judo Championships
1993 in Greek sport
1990s in Athens
Sports competitions in Athens
Judo competitions in Greece
International sports competitions hosted by Greece
May 1993 sports events in Europe